Hamid Zaher (born 1974) is a Canada-based Afghan writer and gay rights activist.

Zaher was born 1974 in the Parwan Province. He studied pharmacy at Kabul University and graduated in 1998. In 2001, he had to flee Afghanistan when his family started pressuring him to get married, due to Afghanistan punishing homosexuality via the death penalty. He arrived in Canada in March 2008.

In 2009, Zaher published a book about his life and upbringing in Afghanistan called Overcoming: Alone Against the World. In response, Zaher's family disowned him.

References

External links
 Zaher's blog

Afghan expatriates in Canada
Afghan writers
Afghan LGBT people
Canadian LGBT rights activists
Canadian gay writers
1974 births
People from Parwan Province
Living people